Courage is the fourth studio album by American singer-songwriter Paula Cole. It marks her return to the music scene after nearly a decade-long hiatus. The album is a departure from her previous work, towards more of a jazz and folk sound. "14" was the first single, while "Comin' Down" was released to Triple A radio in the US in early August. The record also features the song "It's My Life", which was featured in Mercury automobile commercials.

Track listing
 "Comin' Down" (Paula Cole, Dean Parks) – 4:01
 "Lovelight" (Cole, Hassan Hakmoun, Jeff Lorber) – 4:57
 "El Greco" (Cole, Mark Goldenberg) – 4:40
 "Lonelytown" (Cole, Jeremy Lubbock) – 4:40
 "14" (Cole, Patrick Leonard) – 3:38
 "Hard to Be Soft" (Cole, Goldenberg) – 4:53 (with Ivan Lins)
 "It's My Life" (Cole) – 5:31
 "Safe in Your Arms" (Cole, Greg Phillinganes) – 4:56
 "I Wanna Kiss You" (Cole, Goldenberg) – 5:05
 "In Our Dreams" (Cole, Lubbock) – 4:17
 "Until I Met You" (Cole) – 5:03 (with Paul Buchanan)

Bonus Tracks:
 "Don't Miss Me" (iTunes version)
 "Hero's History" (Barnes & Noble version)
 "Love of a Lifetime" (Borders version)
 "Peace"

Charts

Personnel
 Paula Cole – piano, vocals, handclapping
 Tom Arndt – package coordinator
 Pat Barry – art direction
 Jay Bellerose – percussion, drums
 Peter Bernstein – arranger, conductor, string arrangements, string conductor
 Chris Botti – trumpet
 Chris Bruce – guitar
 Paul Buchanan – vocals
 Caroline Buckman – strings
 Susan Chatman – strings
 Billy Childs Trio – piano, Fender Rhodes
 Tim Christensen – strings
 James Farber – engineer
 Fabrizio Ferri – photography
 David Foster – piano
 Brahim Fribgane – percussion
 Steve Genewick – engineer
 Mark Goldenberg – guitar, keyboards
 Hassan Hakmoun – sintir
 Herbie Hancock – piano
 Melissa "Missy" Hasin – strings
 J'Anna Jacoby – strings
 Jimmy Johnson – bass
 Steve Khan – guitar
 Kevin Killen – engineer, mixing
 Billy Kilson – drums
 Gina Kronstadt – strings, concert master
 Greg Leisz – pedal steel
 Tony Levin – bass
 Ivan Lins – vocals
 Jeff Lorber – organ, arranger, keyboards, engineer
 Jeremy Lubbock – arranger, conductor
 Bob Ludwig – mastering
 Pablo Munguia – engineer
 David Palmer – piano, keyboards, melodica
 Dean Parks – dulcimer, guitar, engineer
 David Piltch – bass
 Vincent Potter – stylist
 Kathleen Robertson – string contractor
 Fredrik Sarhagen – engineer
 Al Schmitt – engineer
 Bill Airey Smith – engineer
 Andy Snitzer – digital editing, editing
 Edmund Stein – strings
 Rudolph Stein – strings
 David Stenske – strings
 Ian Walker – bass
 Todd Whitelock – engineer
 Shari Zippert – strings

References

2007 albums
Paula Cole albums
Albums produced by David Foster
Albums produced by Bobby Colomby